The 5th Armored Brigade is a military formation of the Republic of Korea Army. The brigade is subordinated to the V Corps.

Organization 

In 2020, K1E1 tank battalions of the brigade was equipped with maneuvering and combat shooting training system.
Headquarters:
Headquarters Company
Air Defense Artillery Battery (K30 Biho)
Armored Engineer Company
Chemical Company
Armored Reconnaissance Company
Signal Company
Combat Support Battalion
Intelligence Company
38th Armored Battalion (K1E1)
39th Armored Battalion (K1E1)
55th Armored Battalion (K1E1)
113th Mechanized Infantry Battalion (K200)
126th Mechanized Infantry Battalion (K200)
665th Artillery Battalion (K55A1)

References 

Republic of Korea Army
Military units and formations established in 1990
Yangju